John Kennedy (1772 – 10 January 1841) was a Scottish minister of the Church of Scotland who served at Killearnan from 1814 until his death.

Biography 
Kennedy was born in Kishorn in 1772, and studied at King's College, Aberdeen. He was licensed to preach on 24 November 1795 and served as a schoolmaster in Lochcarron before being ordained on 5 December 1798 as minister at Lochbroom. He married Jessie Mackenzie in 1808, and they had nine children, including John Kennedy of Dingwall.

In 1921, Donald Beaton wrote, "Of all the northern ministers there is scarcely any name that stands higher in the estimation of the Church of God than that of the Rev. John Kennedy, minister of Killearnan." Hew Scott described him in 1928 as "one of the most popular ministers in the North Highlands for his saintly character, his acknowledged abilities and preaching powers." 

Leonella Longmore calls Kennedy a "Billy Graham of the early nineteenth century" and notes that his "preaching was such that to hear him some of the faithful would walk twenty to thirty miles every Sunday."


References

Citations

Sources

External links
 John Kennedy of Dingwall, The Minister of Killearnan

1772 births
1841 deaths
19th-century Ministers of the Church of Scotland
People from Ross and Cromarty
Alumni of the University of Aberdeen